Darren Handley (born 18 December 1963) is a former Australian rules footballer who played with Collingwood and Fitzroy in the Victorian Football League (VFL).

Originally playing for Dederang-Mt Beauty Football Club then moved onto Myrtleford, Handley played one season at Collingwood, in 1986. He debuted in round 10 and missed only one game for the rest of the year. His best performance came in Collingwood's win over Fitzroy at Waverley Park, earning three Brownlow Medal votes for 28 disposals and four goals.

Handley played 10 games for Fitzroy, two in 1987 and eight in 1988. He announced in 1989 that he was taking a break from football in order to recover from a chronic groin injury.

He coached Victorian Amateur Football Association club Old Essendon Grammarians in 2006 and 2007.

References

1963 births
Australian rules footballers from Victoria (Australia)
Collingwood Football Club players
Fitzroy Football Club players
Myrtleford Football Club players
Living people
People from Mount Beauty, Victoria